The Kucher K1, also known as the Danuvia M53 K1, was a Hungarian magazine-fed submachine gun designed by József Kucher in 1951 for use by paramilitary, paratrooper and police units, based on the Danuvia 44.M prototype submachine gun. It was produced by the titular Danuvia company.

See also
 PPSh-41
 Type 85 submachine gun - identical Chinese weapon

References

External links

7.62×25mm Tokarev submachine guns
Infantry weapons of the Cold War
Simple blowback firearms
Submachine guns of Hungary
Weapons and ammunition introduced in 1953